Sidney Fine may refer to:
 Sidney A. Fine (1903–1982), Democratic member of the United States House of Representatives from New York
 Sidney Fine (historian) (1920–2009), professor of history at the University of Michigan
 Sidney Fine (composer) (1904–2002), orchestrator and television composer